Cylichnidae, common name the "chalice bubble snails" or "canoe bubble snails" is a family of sea snails or bubble snails, marine gastropod mollusks in the superfamily Cylichnoidea.

Taxonomy

2005 taxonomy 
This family has been classified within the clade Cephalaspidea, itself belonging to the informal group Opisthobranchia (according to the taxonomy of the Gastropoda by Bouchet & Rocroi, 2005). The family Cylichnidae has no subfamilies (according to the taxonomy of the Gastropoda by Bouchet & Rocroi, 2005). Synonyms of Cylichnidae has included: Scaphandridae G. O. Sars, 1878; Tornatinidae P. Fischer, 1883; Acteocinidae Dall, 1913 and Triclidae Winckworth, 1932.

2009 taxonomy 
Malaquias et al. (2009) have reinstated Scaphandridae as a valid family.

Genera
Genera within the family Cylichnidae include:
 Adamnestia Iredale, 1936
 Bogasonia Warén, 1989
 Cylichna Lovén, 1846 - type genus
 † Cylichnania Marwick, 1931
 Cylichnella Gabb, 1873
 Cylichnoides Minichev, 1977
 Decorifer Iredale, 1937
 Mamillocylichna Nordsieck, 1972
 Paracteocina Minichev, 1966
 Semiretusa Thiele, 1925
 Sphaerocylichna Thiele, 1925
 Toledonia Dall, 1902
 Truncacteocina Kuroda & Habe, 1955
Genera brought into synonymy
 Actaeocina [sic]: synonym of Acteocina J. E. Gray, 1847
 Bullinella Newton, 1891: synonym of Cylichna Lovén, 1846
 Clistaxis Cossmann, 1895: synonym of Cylichna Lovén, 1846
 Cryptaxis Jeffreys, 1883: synonym of Cylichna Lovén, 1846
 Cychlinella [sic]: synonym of Cylichnella Gabb, 1873
 Cylichlinella [sic]: synonym of Cylichnella Gabb, 1873
 Cylindrella Swainson, 1840: synonym of Cylichna Lovén, 1846
 Didontoglossa Annandale, 1924: synonym of Tornatina A. Adams, 1850: synonym of Acteocina Gray, 1847
 Eocylichna Kuroda & Habe, 1952: synonym of Cylichna Lovén, 1846
 Cylichnoides Minichev, 1977: synonym of Cylichna Lovén, 1846
 Tornastra Ev. Marcus, 1977: synonym of Cylichnella Gabb, 1873
 Tornatina A. Adams in Sowerby, 1850: synonym of Acteocina Gray, 1847
 Utriculastra Thiele, 1925: synonym of Cylichnella Gabb, 1873

References

Further reading 
 Powell A. W. B., New Zealand Mollusca, William Collins Publishers Ltd, Auckland, New Zealand 1979

External links
 Oskars T.R., Bouchet P. & Malaquias M.A. (2015). A new phylogeny of the Cephalaspidea (Gastropoda: Heterobranchia) based on expanded taxon sampling and gene markers. Molecular Phylogenetics and Evolution. 89: 130-150